Michael Solomon may refer to:
Mike Solomon (born 1954), athlete from Trinidad and Tobago
Meyer Solomon (Michael), 18th-century manufacturer at Bishopsgate, London
Michael Solomon Alexander (1799–1845), first Anglican Bishop in Jerusalem
Michael Jay Solomon (born 1938), American businessman and entertainment executive